Amy Baserga (born 29 September 2000) is a Swiss biathlete. She competed in the 2022 Winter Olympics.

Career
Baserga was a successful junior competitor in biathlon, winning six medals at the Biathlon Junior World Championships. She competed in four biathlon events at the 2022 Winter Olympics. She was part of the Swiss team in the mixed relay, placing 8th out of 20 teams. She placed 69th out of 89 competitors in the individual event, 54th out of 89 competitors in the sprint, and 39th out of 60 competitors in the pursuit.

Personal life
Baserga also participated in athletics, ski jumping, and cross-country skiing before starting biathlon after her older brother Tim discovered the sport in 2007.

References

2000 births
Living people
Biathletes at the 2022 Winter Olympics
Swiss female biathletes
Olympic biathletes of Switzerland
People from Einsiedeln
Sportspeople from Zürich
Sportspeople from the canton of Schwyz